Machaerium cirrhiferum, the espuela de gallo or espuela de gato, is a species of flowering plant in the family Fabaceae. It is found in Colombia, Costa Rica, Mexico, and Panama.

References

cirrhiferum
Neotropical realm flora
Least concern plants
Taxonomy articles created by Polbot